Makarinino is a rural locality (a selo) in Barguzinsky District, Republic of Buryatia, Russia. The population was 293 as of 2010. There are 2 streets.

Geography 
Makarinino is located 43 km southwest of Barguzin (the district's administrative centre) by road. Ust-Barguzin is the nearest rural locality.

References 

Rural localities in Barguzinsky District